Deoksan station is a railway station in South Korea. It was on the Gyeongjeon Line. After double tracking, it became part of the Deoksan Line.

Further reading
 조선총독부관보 고시 328호, 1929년 9월 12일 
 조선총독부관보 고시 49호, 1930년 2월 1일 
 조선총독부관보 고시 144호, 1931년 3월 19일 
 대한민국관보 철도청고시제39,40호, 1989년 12월 4일 
 대한민국관보 국토해양부고시 제 2010-918호, 2010년 12월 13일 

Railway stations in South Gyeongsang Province